The 58th World Science Fiction Convention (Worldcon), also known as Chicon 2000, was held on 31 August–4 September 2000 at the Hyatt Regency Chicago, Sofitel Hotel and Fairmont Hotel in Chicago, Illinois, United States.

The organizing committee was chaired by Tom Veal.

Participants 

Attendance was 5,794, out of 6,574 paid memberships.

Guests of Honor 

 Ben Bova (author)
 Bob Eggleton (artist)
 Jim Baen (editor)
 Bob Passovoy & Anne Passovoy (fan)
 Harry Turtledove (toastmaster)

Other program participants 

In addition to the guests of honor, Chicon 2000 had 613 program participants taking part in over 1,000 programming items. Some of the notable science fiction writers participating to the convention included:

 Kevin J. Anderson
 Catherine Asaro
 David Brin
 Jack L. Chalker
 John Clute
 Esther M. Friesner
 Richard Garfinkle

 Elizabeth Hand
 Harry Harrison
 Paul Levinson
 George R. R. Martin
 Jack McDevitt
 Larry Niven
 Frederik Pohl

 Terry Pratchett
 Mike Resnick
 Robert Silverberg
 Michael Swanwick
 Connie Willis
 Gene Wolfe

Future site selection 

The 61st World Science Fiction Convention to be held in 2003 was awarded to Toronto, Ontario, Canada.

Awards

2000 Hugo Awards 

The awards were administered by Michael Nelson, Covert Beach, Robert MacIntosh, Tom Veal, Mike Jencevice, and Becky Thomson. The base was designed by Johnna Klukas.

 Best Novel: A Deepness in the Sky by Vernor Vinge
 Best Novella: "The Winds of Marble Arch" by Connie Willis
 Best Novelette: "1016 to 1" by James Patrick Kelly
 Best Short Story: "Scherzo with Dinosaur" by Michael Swanwick
 Best Related Book: Science Fiction of the 20th Century: An Illustrated History by Frank M. Robinson
 Best Dramatic Presentation: Galaxy Quest
 Best Professional Editor: Gardner Dozois
 Best Professional Artist: Michael Whelan
 Best Semiprozine: Locus, edited by Charles N. Brown
 Best Fanzine: File 770, edited by Mike Glyer
 Best Fan Writer: Dave Langford
 Best Fan Artist: Joe Mayhew (posthumous)

Other awards 

 John W. Campbell Award for Best New Writer: Cory Doctorow

The bid 

During the bidding process, Chicago in 2000 issued approximately forty trading cards depicting a variety of science fiction authors and artists, including Gordon R. Dickson, Terry Pratchett, and Larry Niven. Anyone who collected twenty of the cards and voted in site selection received a free membership conversion to Chicon 2000. When Chicago in 2000 won, they issued a trading card #0 that announced their guests of honor.

See also 

 Hugo Award
 Science fiction
 Speculative fiction
 World Science Fiction Society
 Worldcon

References

External links 

 Chicon 2000 official website
  
 Table of Contents for 82 Online Author Chats conducted at Chicon 2000

2000 conferences
2000 in Illinois
2000 in the United States
Culture of Chicago
Harry Turtledove
Science fiction conventions in the United States
Worldcon